Josef Elvby, née Karlsson (born 13 July 1982) is a Swedish footballer. He is currently playing for Spanish amateur-side CF Torre Levante.

He began his footballing career playing as "Josef Karlsson". When he got married in June 2011 he changed his name to Elvby.

He started his career in IFK Värnamo, before he moved to Superettan side Qviding FIF. In 2009, he joined BK Häcken in Allsvenskan.

On June 30, 2011 he made his UEFA Europa League debut against UN Käerjéng 97. He played all six games in UEFA Europa League when BK Häcken in 2011 qualified to the third qualification round. In January 2013 he signed for Östers IF in Allsvenskan.

References

External links
 

1982 births
Living people
Swedish footballers
IFK Värnamo players
BK Häcken players
Östers IF players
Superettan players
Allsvenskan players
Association football midfielders
CF Torre Levante players